Kettering Health, formerly known as Kettering Health Network and Kettering Medical Center Network, is a nonprofit network of fourteen Dayton and Cincinnati area medical centers, Kettering College, and 120 outpatient facilities. The system is based in Dayton, Ohio, United States. The network was formed following the merger of Kettering Medical Center and Grandview Medical Center in 1999. As part of the 2021 renaming of Kettering Health Network to Kettering Health, all of the hospitals in the network were renamed, with the exception of Soin. In addition, Kettering Physician Network was renamed Kettering Health Medical Group. Kettering Health has over 12,000 employees and 2,100 physicians.

Medical Centers
Kettering Health operates fourteen hospitals in the Southwest Ohio region.

See also

 AdventHealth
 Adventist Health
 Adventist HealthCare
 Kettering College
 List of hospitals in Ohio
 List of Seventh-day Adventist hospitals

External links

References

 
Companies based in Dayton, Ohio
Healthcare in Dayton, Ohio
Kettering, Ohio
Hospital networks in the United States
Medical and health organizations based in Ohio
Non-profit organizations based in Ohio
Adventist organizations established in the 20th century
1999 establishments in Ohio